The 2013 North Indian Ocean cyclone season was an event in the annual cycle of tropical cyclone formation, in which tropical cyclones formed in the North Indian Ocean and Arabian Sea. The season had no official bounds, but cyclones typically formed between May and December, with the peak from October to November. These dates conventionally delimit the period of each year when most tropical cyclones form in the northern Indian Ocean.

The scope of this article is limited to the Indian Ocean in the Northern Hemisphere, east of the Horn of Africa and west of the Malay Peninsula. There are two main seas in the North Indian Ocean — the Arabian Sea to the west of the Indian subcontinent, abbreviated ARB by the India Meteorological Department (IMD); and the Bay of Bengal to the east, abbreviated BOB by the IMD.

The official Regional Specialized Meteorological Centre in this basin is the India Meteorological Department (IMD), while the Joint Typhoon Warning Center releases unofficial advisories. On average, 4 to 6 storms form in this basin every season.



Season summary

After a five-month break in tropical cyclone activity over the basin, the first depression of the year developed over the southern Bay of Bengal on May 10, 2013. The system subsequently developed into Cyclonic Storm Viyaru during May 12, before it made landfall near Chittagong, Bangladesh during May 16. As a result of the formation of Viyaru, the low level equatorial monsoon flow strengthened over southern parts of the North Indian Ocean, which in turn allowed the south-west monsoon to set in over the Andaman Sea and parts of the Bay of Bengal during May 17. A depression developed and made landfall on West Bengal, during May 29, before it was last noted during May 31. During June 1, the south-west monsoon set in over Kerala, the Maldives and parts of the south and central Arabian Sea. Over the next two weeks one of the fastest onsets of the monsoon over India was observed  After the monsoon had set in over Kerala, one of the fastest onsets of the monsoon over India was observed, with the whole nation covered by June 16 or about a month earlier than normal. Reasons for the fast onset included a favourable phase of the Madden–Julian oscillation and the west-northwest movement of an area of low pressure between June 12–16.

Systems

Cyclonic Storm Viyaru

Originating from an area of low pressure over the southern Bay of Bengal in early May 2013, Viyaru slowly consolidated into a depression on May 10. The depression gained forward momentum and attained gale-force winds on May 11 and was designated as Cyclonic Storm Viyaru, the first named storm of the season. Operationally, the system was referred to as Mahasen; however, this was altered in 2014 with the final report and all archived advisories changed to show Viyaru. Owing to adverse atmospheric conditions, the depression struggled to maintain organized convection as it moved closer to eastern India. On May 14, the exposed circulation of Viyaru turned northeastward. The following day, conditions again allowed for the storm to intensify. Shortly thereafter Viyaru made landfall near Chittagong, Bangladesh. On May 17, it moved over the eastern Indian state of Nagaland.

Early in the storm's existence, it brought flooding rains to much of northwestern Indonesia, resulting in significant damage. At least four people died and six others were reported missing. In preparation for the storm, large-scale evacuations were recommended for parts of Myanmar. This resulted with people overcrowding boats to escape, and one or several vessels capsized, causing at least 39 deaths; 42 people were rescued while 19 others were unaccounted for and feared dead. The storm's expansive cloud mass also brought unsettled weather to Sri Lanka, Thailand, and southeastern India. Severe storms in India and Sri Lanka were responsible for at least 16 fatalities and significant damage; one person died in Thailand. Striking Bangladesh in a weaker state than initially expected, damage was moderate to severe. A total of 95,003 poorly constructed huts were damaged or destroyed, 17 people died, and nearly 1.3 million were affected across the country. Losses to crops exceeded ৳2.75 billion (US$35.3 million). Myanmar was spared damage and further casualties.

Depression BOB 02

An upper air cyclonic circulation developed into a low-pressure area on May 28. It slowly organized itself, and favorable conditions led to the intensification of the low-pressure area to a depression by the early hours of May 29. Staying almost a day inland maintaining depression strength, it weakened gradually and dissipated over the states of Bihar and Jharkhand in the evening hours of May 31 due to land interaction and reduced moisture availability. Contai in West Bengal received 260 mm of rainfall in 24 hours on May 30.

Depression BOB 03

A low-pressure area formed over the Bay of Bengal on July 29. It intensified gradually, and the IMD classified the storm as a Depression in the early hours of July 30. Spending an entire day inland, the depression weakened into a well-marked low-pressure area on August 1 over the state of Madhya Pradesh in India.

The storm's precursor brought heavy rainfall to coastal Bangladesh. 30,000 people were marooned as a result of the following severe floods in Kalapara Upazila. In India, a Storm Warning Signal-3 was hoisted in the ports of Odisha, and fishermen were cautioned against venturing into the sea. Chicholi in Madhya Pradesh received 280 mm of rainfall in 24 hours on August 1, 2013.

Land Depression 01

A monsoonal low-pressure area formed over the Bay of Bengal on August 16. It gradually intensified, organizing itself into a Depression in the early hours of August 20 over coastal West Bengal and adjoining northern Odisha and Jharkhand. Over the next few days, the storm moved west-northwestward, before weakening into a well-marked low-pressure area on August 23.

The depression brought heavy rainfall to coastal West Bengal. Kolkata received  of rainfall over a span of three days, the wettest spell of the monsoon season, causing flooding. At least four people were reported to have been killed across the state due to rain-related events. The system's precursor low caused authorities to raise cautionary signal number 3, at all maritime ports of Bangladesh. Pachmarhi in Madhya Pradesh received  of rainfall in 72 hours.

Extremely Severe Cyclonic Storm Phailin

A tropical depression formed along the Gulf of Thailand on October 4. The tropical depression degenerated into a remnant low on October 6, as it crossed the 100th meridian on October 7. Under the influence of an upper air cyclonic circulation, it regenerated into a low-pressure area over the Andaman Sea and adjoining Tanintharyi region. It slowly organized itself and consolidated into a depression on October 8, followed by the Joint Typhoon Warning Center (JTWC) issuing a Tropical Cyclone Formation Alert (TCFA) the same day. In the early hours of October 9 the JTWC upgraded the storm to a tropical cyclone. The same day, the IMD upgraded the storm to a deep depression, and subsequently a cyclonic storm, naming it Phailin. Rapid intensification ensued, and Phailin strengthened into a Very Severe Cyclonic storm on October 10, followed by the JTWC upgrading the storm to a strong Category 4 status. Continuing its rapid intensification, the storm reached Category 5 status the following day, the first storm to do so in the North Indian Ocean since Cyclone Sidr in 2007. Shortly before landfall, Phailin began another eyewall replacement cycle which led to slight weakening, and the system jumped back to Category 4 status. Maintaining intensity, the storm made landfall close to Gopalpur, Odisha in the evening of October 12. Phailin rapidly weakened as it tracked over rugged terrain, eventually dissipating into a well marked low-pressure area over the state of Bihar on October 14.

The cyclone prompted India's biggest evacuation in 23 years with more than 550,000 people moving up from the coastline in Odisha and Andhra Pradesh to safer places. 44 deaths related to the cyclone were reported.

Deep Depression ARB 01

In early November, a low-pressure area formed over the Arabian Sea. It slowly moved westwards and consolidated into Depression ARB 01 on November 8. The JTWC issued a Tropical Cyclone Formation Alert the same day, reporting that the depression was moving into an area favorable for further intensification. The next morning, the IMD upgraded the storm to a deep depression; the JTWC similarly upgraded the system to a tropical storm following reports of  winds near the storm's center of circulation. Remaining stationary for nearly a day, the storm crossed the coast of Somalia early on November 11. The system rapidly deteriorated due to land interaction, and both the JTWC and the IMD issued their final warnings on the system later that day.

ARB 01 made landfall in the northeastern Puntland region on November 9, and dissipated by the 11th. Around 300 fatalities were reported in the wake of the storm, as well as livestock casualties and damaged infrastructure. Much of the damage was averted by an early administrative response overseen by the Puntland Disaster Management and Rescue committee, which coordinated relief efforts by the Puntland Maritime Police Force, governmental rescue teams, and the Puntland Highway Authority.

Depression BOB 05

On November 8, the remnants of Tropical Depression 30W (Wilma) crossed the Malay Peninsula, and emerged into the eastern Bay of Bengal. During the next several days, the system drifted towards the west while weakening further. On November 12, the system began to reorganize gradually, while continuing to move westwards. On November 13, the system was classified as a depression by the IMD, and given the identifier BOB 05. The depression maintained its intensity despite passing through an environment unfavorable for intensification, and was re-upgraded to tropical cyclone intensity by the JTWC on November 15. Shortly before landfall, the system weakened due to land interaction, and the JTWC issued its final warning. On November 16, BOB 05 made landfall near Nagapattinam, Tamil Nadu, and the system quickly began to weaken. Later on November 16, the IMD issued its final advisory on Depression BOB 05, as the system weakened into a well-marked area of low pressure. Over the next several hours, the remnant low of BOB 05 moved across the central part of Southern India, and the system continued to weaken. During the next several days, BOB 05 moved westwards across the Arabian Sea as a convectionless low. Later, the remnants of BOB 05 redeveloped a small amount of convection, while continuing to moved westwards. Late on November 21, the remnants of BOB 05 turned to the southwest, affecting Socotra Island on November 22. Early on November 23, the remnants of Depression BOB 05 dissipated just south of Socotra Island.

Heavy rains along with 60 km/h winds lashed many parts of the state of Tamil Nadu. Mayiladuthurai, a town in Nagapattinam district, experienced the highest rainfall, amounting to 220 mm.  13 people were killed as the Depression crossed the state's coast.

Severe Cyclonic Storm Helen

Late on November 17, the remnant energy of Tropical Storm Podul contributed to the development of a trough over the Bay of Bengal, located near the Andaman Islands. During the next couple of days, the storm slowly organized and consolidated, prompting the Joint Typhoon Warning Center (JTWC) to issue a Tropical Cyclone Formation Alert (TCFA) during the early hours of November 19. Later on the same day, the India Meteorological Department (IMD) upgraded the storm to a depression, classifying it as BOB 06, followed by the JTWC reporting that the storm had reached Tropical Storm strength. A couple of hours later, the IMD upgraded BOB 06 into a Deep Depression, as the storm continued to intensify.

The storm slowly drifted west-northwestward while deep convection consolidated around the system's well-defined center of circulation. In the early hours of November 20, the IMD classified BOB 06 as a Cyclonic Storm, thereby officially naming it Helen. Shortly before landfall, the storm's convection sheared to the north, causing its low level circulation to fully expose followed by the JTWC issuing its final bulletin, reporting that the storm had weakened due to land interaction. Helen made landfall south of Machilipatnam, Andhra Pradesh and rapidly deteriorated into a deep depression. It was last noted as a low-pressure area on November 23. A total of 11 deaths were reported in incidents related to the cyclone.

Very Severe Cyclonic Storm Lehar

A low-pressure area formed over the South China Sea on November 18. It was then classified as a tropical depression later that day. It weakened into a low-pressure area on November 22 as it crossed the Isthmus of Kra and entered the Andaman Sea. It then  gradually intensified, and the JTWC classified the system as a tropical depression on November 23. Later on the same day, the storm was upgraded into Depression BOB 07 by the IMD, while the JTWC upgraded the system into a tropical storm. The following day, the BOB 07 strengthened further into a cyclonic storm, and the IMD assigned it the name Lehar. On November 25, the storm gradually consolidated further and was upgraded to a severe cyclonic storm by the IMD, while the JTWC reported that the storm had reached Category 1 status in the SSHS hurricane scale. Early on November 27, the JTWC reported the storm's low-level circulation center (LLCC) was losing its structure due to vertical wind shear, indicating a weakening trend. Thereafter, Lehar rapidly weakened into a depression and made landfall near Machilipatnam on November 28. Land interaction led to the degeneration of the storm into a well-marked low-pressure area, while it moved inland.

The cyclone affected the Andaman Islands with heavy rain and strong winds. It caused flooding, landslides, road blockage, uprooting of trees and damage to buildings. More than two dozen fishermen went missing and almost all of them were rescued by the Coast Guard and police. In Little Andaman, more than 2000 people were evacuated and kept in Onge-tikrey community hall there. In nearby Havelock Island, about 1500 people sought shelter in the Panchayat community hall. Mayabander and Port Blair recorded 24-hour rainfall accumulations of 243 mm and 213 mm respectively as the cyclone made landfall. Four flights originating from Chennai bound to Port Blair were cancelled due to the cyclone on November 25 while  winds lashed the islands.

Very Severe Cyclonic Storm Madi

On November 30, a low-pressure area formed south of India close to the equator. A day later, microwave satellite imagery revealed a broad low-level circulation center (LLCC). The system slowly drifted northeastward over the next couple of days and slowly intensified. Though the sea surface temperatures were good enough for tropical cyclogenesis, moderate vertical wind shear kept the system from strengthening too quickly. On December 5, the JTWC issued a TCFA on the system. The following day, the storm strengthened further, and the JTWC initiated advisories on the system, designating it as "06B". Around the same time, the IMD started tracking this system as Depression BOB 08. The storm remained nearly stationary over the next 24 hours.

Tracking slowly north-northwestward under the influence of a deep shortwave trough, the storm quickly intensified into a severe cyclonic storm. Madi accelerated slightly while maintaining a large area of convection. By December 8, Madi had developed an excellent poleward outflow, with deep convection wrapped into a well-defined center. With this, the IMD upgraded Madi to a Very Severe Cyclonic Storm, the third in 2013. However, Madi moved into an area of increasing vertical wind shear, causing weakening. Madi's poleward track was explained by the strong subtropical ridge located to the east of the system. On December 9, the IMD reported that Madi had weakened into a Severe Cyclonic storm. Despite the wind shear, Madi developed an eye on December 10, and the JTWC assessed the system as a Category 1 equivalent for a second time. Against all expectations, the storm continued to track in a northerly direction, until later that day, when it made a sharp, sudden, southwestward turn. Madi started losing all its convection to the strong wind shear. Another subtropical ridge located over India had steered the system southwestward. On December 11, Madi's LLCC became clearly exposed after dry air wrapped around the southern part of the system. This weakened Madi into a Cyclonic Storm, and later into a deep depression. Overnight, Madi weakened further into a depression and crossed the  Tamil Nadu coast close to Vedaranyam around 1330 UTC on December 12, 2013. It then emerged into the Palk Strait at 1530 UTC and crossed the Tamil Nadu coast again near Thondi at 1700 UTC on the same day. Colachel in Kanyakumari district of Tamil Nadu got the highest rainfall of 115 mm in 24 hours on December 13.

Season effects
This is a table of all storms in the 2013 North Indian Ocean cyclone season. It mentions all of the season's storms and their names, durations, peak intensities (according to the IMD storm scale), landfall(s) – denoted by bold location names – damages, and death totals. Damage and death totals include the damage and deaths caused when that storm was a precursor wave or extratropical low, and all of the damage figures are in 2013 USD.

|-
| Viyaru ||  || bgcolor=#| || bgcolor=#| || bgcolor=#|  || Indonesia, Thailand, Sri Lanka, India, Bangladesh, Myanmar || > ||  ||
|-
| BOB 02 ||  || bgcolor=#| || bgcolor=#| || bgcolor=#| || Bangladesh, India || None || None ||
|-
| BOB 03 ||  || bgcolor=#| || bgcolor=#| || bgcolor=#||| Bangladesh, India || None || None ||
|-
| LAND 01 ||  || bgcolor=#| || bgcolor=#| || bgcolor=#||| India || None || 4 ||
|-
| Phailin ||  || bgcolor=#| || bgcolor=#| || bgcolor=#| || Malay Peninsula, Andaman and Nicobar Islands, India, Myanmar, Nepal ||  || 45 ||
|-
| ARB 01 ||  || bgcolor=#| || bgcolor=#| || bgcolor=#||| Somalia, Ethiopia || Unknown || 162 || 
|-
| BOB 05 ||  || bgcolor=#| || bgcolor=#| || bgcolor=#| || Malay Peninsula, Myanmar, Andaman Islands, Southern India, Sri Lanka, Yemen || None || 16 ||
|-
| Helen ||  || bgcolor=#| || bgcolor=#| || bgcolor=#| || India ||  || 11 || 
|-
| Lehar ||  || bgcolor=#| || bgcolor=#| || bgcolor=#||| Malay Peninsula, Andaman and Nicobar Islands, India || None || None ||
|-
| Madi ||  || bgcolor=#| || bgcolor=#| || bgcolor=#| || Sri Lanka, India, Maldives || Unknown || None ||
|-

See also

 Timeline of the 2013 North Indian Ocean cyclone season
Tropical cyclones in 2013 
 2013 Atlantic hurricane season
 2013 Pacific hurricane season
 2013 Pacific typhoon season
 South-West Indian Ocean cyclone seasons: 2012–13, 2013–14
 Australian region cyclone seasons: 2012–13, 2013–14
 South Pacific cyclone seasons: 2012–13, 2013–14

Notes

References

External links
India Meteorological Department
Joint Typhoon Warning Center 
Rapid Response - Cyclone Relief Organisation

 
Articles which contain graphical timelines
2013 NIO